Barleycorn is an English surname. Notable people with the surname include:

Edward Barleycorn (1891–1978), Equatoguinean politician
Napoleon Barleycorn, Primitive Methodist missionary
William Barleycorn (1848–1925), Primitive Methodist missionary

Surnames
English-language surnames
Surnames of English origin
Surnames of British Isles origin